R'Kiz is a department of Trarza Region in Mauritania.

References 

Departments of Mauritania